The Hopkins River is in the central South Island of New Zealand.

Its headwaters, on the southern slopes of Mount Hopkins, form the northernmost point of Otago, and the river's braided valley is part of the border between Otago and Canterbury. The river's main tributary is the Dobson River.

References

Rivers of Canterbury, New Zealand
Rivers of Otago
Rivers of New Zealand